Francesco Minto (born 29 May 1987) is a former Italian rugby union player, and has been capped for the Italian national team for 39 occasions. His usual position was at flank.

From 2010 to 2018 he currently played for Benetton in the Pro14.

On 24 August 2015, he was named in the final 31-man squad for the 2015 Rugby World Cup.

References

External links
RBS 6 Nations profile
It's Rugby France Profile

1987 births
Italian rugby union players
Italy international rugby union players
Living people
Rugby union locks
Benetton Rugby players
Sportspeople from Benevento
Rugby Club I Medicei players